Benignus may refer to:

 Saint Benignus of Dijon (3rd century), martyr and patron saint of Dijon, Burgundy (France)
 Saint Benignus of Todi (d. 303), martyr at Todi, Umbria (Italy)
 Saint Benignus of Armagh (died 467), Irish disciple of St. Patrick
 Saint Benignus (bishop of Milan) (died 472), archbishop of Milan (Italy), 465–472
 Saint Benignus of Malcesine, (Benigno di Malcesine) often referenced with Carus of Malcesine
 Saint Benignus of Fontenelle (fl. 725), abbot of Fontenelle Abbey (France)
 Benignus von Safferling (1825–1895), General of the Infantry and war minister under Otto of Bavaria

See also
 Benign (disambiguation)
 Benignity, medical term
 Benigno (disambiguation)
 Benigni (disambiguation), surname